Slinzega is a type of air-dried meat produced in Valtellina and Valchiavenna in the Italian Alps. It is made in a similar manner to Bresaola, with smaller pieces of meat, which therefore bear a stronger taste. According to some sources it originally used horse meat rather than beef. Nevertheless, today virtually any type of meat is suitable to its production, the most common being beef, deer and pork.

Characteristic 
Aesthetically it looks quite similar to bresaola, but it is produced in much smaller sizes (300-800 g) and has a much stronger flavor due to the aromatization with salt, cinnamon, cloves, garlic, bay leaf and pepper.

The charcuterie lasts about a month.

See also

 List of dried foods

External links 
 Salami and Sausages of Valtellina

References

Italian cuisine
Dried meat